Milikapiti is a village on the northern coast of Melville Island, Northern Territory, Australia. At the 2011 census, Milikapiti had a population of 447.

Fly Tiwi airlines fly twice daily to and from Darwin servicing Milikapiti. The flight takes approximately 25 minutes.

The day-to-day management of the Milikapiti community is the responsibility of the Tiwi Islands Regional Council.

History
Milikapiti was founded in the 1941 as the Snake Bay government aboriginal settlement.

In 1942, aboriginals from Snake Bay captured Australia's first Japanese prisoner of war, Sergeant Hajime Toyoshima, who crash-landed on Melville Island after his plane was damaged while bombing Darwin. The Snake Bay Patrol was also formed from local Indigenous Australians during World War II.

Community services and facilities
 Store and Take Away
 ATM facilities
 Post Office facilities
 School and Pre School
 Recreation Hall
 Basketball court
 Football oval
 Library
 Centrelink agency
 Women's Centre
 Health Centre
 Club (open 4.30pm – 7.30pm 4 days per week)
 Public Garage
 St Monica's Catholic Church
 Museum
 Jilamara Arts and Crafts

Notes and references

Towns in the Northern Territory
Aboriginal communities in the Northern Territory
Tiwi Islands
1941 establishments in Australia